Maxwell "Max" Tolson  born 18 July 1945 in Wollongong, Australia is a former association football forward. He was a member of the Australian 1974 World Cup squad in West Germany and represented Australia 19 times in total scoring 4 goals as well as representing NSW.

References

See also

1945 births
Living people
Sportspeople from Wollongong
Australian soccer players
Australia international soccer players
1974 FIFA World Cup players
Marconi Stallions FC players
Sydney United 58 FC players
South Coast United players
Association football forwards